André Antoine (born 3 February 1960) is a Belgian politician, minister and mayor.  He has been a member of the francophone cdH (Humanist Democratic Centre party) since 1980.  He was elected to the presidency of the Wallon parliament on 22 July 2014.

Life

Early years
André Antoine was born in Leuven/Louvain. He comes from a farming family. He achieved his Licentiate in Law at the University of Louvain (UCLouvain) in Louvain-la-Neuve in 1983. His degree in Higher European Studies followed a year later.

His political career began in 1980 when he joined the Christian Socialist Party (PSC, as the cdH was then called), becoming a special advisor to the party presidency. In 1983 he started to work as a cabinet assistant for the Belgian Minister for Scientific Policy and Panning, Philippe Maystadt, moving on to work as an "attaché" to the party president in 1984/85.

Local government
Antoine was a member of the municipal council in Ramillies between 1988 and 1994. Since 1994 he has been a councillor in nearby Perwez where he has also served as the mayor since 2000.

Regional government
In October 1985 he was selected as a PSC representative ("volksvertegenwoordiger") for the Nivelles Arrondissement, a mandate he retained till 1991. In 1995 he became a member of the newly renamed and reconfigured Parliament of Wallonia in Namur, and the Parliament of the French Community, which for most purposes is the name used for the same parliament when convening in Brussels as part of the national legislative structure.

Re-elected to the Wallon parliament in 1999, he became the leader of the PSC group in it. In 2003 Joëlle Milquet appointed Antoine a vice-president of the recently renamed cdH (party), hitherto the PSC.

The next year, 2004, he attained ministerial office, becoming the regional Minister for Housing, Transport and Regeneration. His wide palette of responsibilities included general and school transport, energy policy, housing and land use, zoning, airports and railway investment.  In 2009 he became regional Minister for the Budget, Finance, Employment, Training and Sport. Despite the chan ge of post, he retained responsibility for airports policy in Wallonia, which under an EU directive from 2002 gives him the power to place a ban on night takes-offs and landings. However, it is not a power he exercised: there are very few night time take-offs and landings in Wallonia.

Re-elected to the assembly again in 2014, he became president of the Wallon parliament on 22 July 2014.

References

1960 births
Living people
Centre démocrate humaniste politicians
Mayors of places in Belgium
Transport ministers of Wallonia
Finance ministers of Wallonia
Housing ministers of Wallonia
Members of the Parliament of Wallonia
Politicians from Leuven
People from Perwez
People from Ramillies, Belgium
Université catholique de Louvain alumni
Belgian senators of the 57th legislature